The Arrondissement of Philippeville is one of the three administrative arrondissements in the Walloon province of Namur, Wallonia, Belgium.

The Administrative Arrondissement of Philippeville consists of the following municipalities:
 Cerfontaine
 Couvin
 Doische
 Florennes
 Philippeville
 Viroinval
 Walcourt

References

Philippeville